Vaugirard is a station on Line 12 of the Paris Métro in the 15th arrondissement.

The station opened on 5 November 1910 as part of the original section of the Nord-Sud Company's line A between Porte de Versailles and Montparnasse. It is named after the Rue de Vaugirard. Adolphe Chérioux (a former Mayor of the district) is sometimes added to the station's name. This is also the name of the public garden extending from the station to the town hall of the 15th Arrondissement.

The station is unusual in that it contains two shops (newsagent and clothes store) even though it is not an interchange station.

Station layout

References

Roland, Gérard (2003). Stations de métro. D’Abbesses à Wagram. Éditions Bonneton.

Paris Métro stations in the 15th arrondissement of Paris
Railway stations in France opened in 1910